Shawfair is a railway station on the Borders Railway, which runs between  and . It is owned by Network Rail and managed by ScotRail.

History
At this point the line does not follow the old Waverley Route via Millerhill, the trackbed of which was severed by the construction of the Edinburgh City Bypass in the 1980s.

The construction work was undertaken by BAM Nuttall opening on 6 September 2015.

Services

As of the May 2021 timetable change, the station is served by an hourly service between Edinburgh Waverley and Tweedbank, with a half-hourly service operating at peak times (Monday to Saturday). Some peak time trains continue to Glenrothes with Thornton. All services are operated by ScotRail.

Rolling stock used: Class 158 Express Sprinter and Class 170 Turbostar

Notes

References

External links
 
 

Railway stations in Midlothian
Railway stations opened by Network Rail
Railway stations in Great Britain opened in 2015
Railway stations served by ScotRail
Borders Railway
2015 establishments in Scotland